Duke Xian of Qi (died 851 BC) was from 859 to 851 BC the seventh recorded ruler of the State of Qi during the Western Zhou Dynasty of ancient China.  His personal name was Lü Shan (呂山), ancestral name Jiang (姜), and Duke Xian was his posthumous title.

Duke Xian was a younger son of Duke Gui of Qi.  When Duke Gui died, Duke Xian's older brother Buchen ascended the throne, to be posthumously known as Duke Ai of Qi.  Duke Ai had a dispute with the marquis of Qi's neighbouring state Ji (紀).  King Yi of Zhou sided with Marquis of Ji and executed Duke Ai by boiling him to death.  King Yi then installed Jing, a half-brother of Duke Ai and Duke Xian, on the throne, to be posthumously known as Duke Hu of Qi.

Duke Hu moved the capital of Qi from Yingqiu (later known as Linzi) to Pugu (or Bogu).  The move was resented by the people of Yingqiu, who rebelled under the leadership of Duke Xian. Duke Hu was killed and Duke Xian ascended the throne.

Duke Xian expelled the sons of Duke Hu and moved the capital back to Linzi.  He reigned for 9 years and died in 851 BC.  He was succeeded by his son, Duke Wu of Qi.

Family
Sons:
 Prince Shou (d. 825 BC), ruled as Duke Wu of Qi from 849–825 BC

Ancestry

References

Year of birth unknown
Monarchs of Qi (state)
9th-century BC Chinese monarchs
851 BC deaths